The Men's Abierto Mexicano de Raquetas 2012 is the men's edition of the 2012 Abierto Mexicano de Raquetas, which is a tournament of the PSA World Tour event International (prize money: 70 000 $). The event took place in Toluca in Mexico from 1 to 4 November. Grégory Gaultier won his first Abierto Mexicano de Raquetas trophy, beating Omar Mosaad in the final.

Prize money and ranking points
For 2012, the prize purse was $70,000. The prize money and points breakdown is as follows:

Seeds

Draw and results

See also
PSA World Tour 2012
Abierto Mexicano de Raquetas

References

External links
PSA Abierto Mexicano de Raquetas 2012 website
Abierto Mexicano de Raquetas official website

Squash tournaments in Mexico
Abierto Mexicano de Raquetas
Abierto Mexicano de Raquetas